The Salto Grande Bridge is a road and railroad bridge that crosses the Uruguay River and joins Argentina and Uruguay. It is built on top of the Salto Grande Dam. The bridge runs between Concordia, Entre Ríos Province, Argentina, and Salto, Salto Department, Uruguay.

References
 EntreRiosTotal.com.ar (touristic website)
 Represa Salto Grande (Salto Grande Dam) from the Spanish Wikipedia

See also
 Libertador General San Martín Bridge
 General Artigas Bridge
 Cellulose plant conflict between Argentina and Uruguay

Bridges in Argentina
Bridges in Uruguay
Buildings and structures in Entre Ríos Province
Buildings and structures in Salto Department
International bridges
Argentina–Uruguay border crossings
Bridges over the Uruguay River